Dolní Dobrouč is a municipality and village in Ústí nad Orlicí District in the Pardubice Region of the Czech Republic. It has about 2,600 inhabitants.

Administrative parts
Villages of Horní Dobrouč and Lanšperk are administrative parts of Dolní Dobrouč.

Notable people
Zdeněk Beran (1937–2014), painter
Kamil Vacek (born 1987), footballer; raised here
Šimon Falta (born 1993), footballer

Twin towns – sister cities

Dolní Dobrouč is twinned with:
 Rovereto, Italy

References

External links

Villages in Ústí nad Orlicí District